John "Jack" Elliott (also spelled Jack Elliot) (13 August 1871 – 30 March 1938) was a Welsh rugby union scrum-half who played club rugby for Cardiff and international rugby for Wales, winning three caps.

Although born in the North-East of England, Elliott was living in Cardiff, the Welsh capital by the time he was a young man. He became the director of the Mountstuart Dry Dock at Cardiff Docks and was a property owner.

Rugby career
Elliott began his rugby career playing for Llandaff, before switching to local rivals Cardiff. He was first selected to represent Wales when he was brought in at centre to replace Welsh sporting legend and team captain, Arthur 'Monkey' Gould, in the final game of the 1894 Home Nations Championship. Elliott was paired at centre with fellow Cardiff teammate Dai Fitzgerald and completed an all Cardiff threequarter along with Tom Pearson and Norman Biggs. Wales lost the game by a single penalty goal on a boggy Belfast pitch, and the next season Elliott was replaced by Gould.

Elliott was given the captaincy of Cardiff for the 1896-97 season and four years after his previous international cap was called back into the Welsh team for the 1898 Championship. Elliot played in both Welsh games of the tournament, this time brought in at his more familiar position of scrum-half alongside Selwyn Biggs. Wales won the first game against Ireland, and Elliott was reselected for the final game of the tournament, against England. The next year, Elliott and Biggs were replaced by the Swansea brothers David and Evan James.

After retiring from playing rugby, Elliott continued his connection with the sport by becoming a first class referee. He was also a keen golfer and in 1935 was the captain of Royal Porthcawl Golf Club.

International matches played
Wales
  1898
  1894, 1898

Bibliography

References

1871 births
1938 deaths
Cardiff RFC players
Llandaff RFC players
Rugby union players from South Shields
Rugby union scrum-halves
Wales international rugby union players
Welsh rugby union players